Club Deportivo Colonia Moscardó is a Spanish football team based in Madrid, in the namesake community. Founded in 1945 it currently plays in Tercera División Group 7, holding home matches at Estadio Román Valero with a capacity of 14,000 seats.

History
The club was born in 1944 with the aim to create a team for the players of the neighbourhoods of Usera and Colonia de Moscardó. It was officially registered in the Castilian Football Federation on 23 July 1945, and currently belongs to the Madrid Football Federation.

In 1964, Moscardó promoted for the first time to Tercera División, and six years later to Segunda División. The club only could remain in the second tier one season before being relegated again to Tercera; it was the first club to play in the league with a pitch of soil, without grass.

Since that relegation, the club alternated Tercera División and Preferente until 1989, when it promoted to Segunda División B, and alternated Segunda B and Tercera during the 1990s. In the 2000s, the club ended its second golden era and continues playing between fourth and fifth tier.

Stadium

Moscardó play their games at Estadio Román Valero, with capacity for 5,000 people.

During the 1960s, it was expanded for 12,000 people and in the 1970s, the turf was installed. In the 1990s, one of the stands was demolished due to safety reasons.

In 2008, the pitch was replaced by an artificial one.

Season to season

1 season in Segunda División
4 seasons in Segunda División B
36 seasons in Tercera División

Segunda División B – Promotions

Season 1992/93

Season 1993/94

Famous players
 Lino
 Oscar Téllez
 José María Movilla

References

External links
Futmadrid profile 
Futbolme team profile 

Football clubs in Madrid
Association football clubs established in 1945
1945 establishments in Spain
Segunda División clubs
Usera